Nathan Filipo Ilaoa (born April 4, 1983) is a former American football running back. He was drafted by the Philadelphia Eagles in the seventh round of the 2007 NFL Draft. He played college football at Hawaii.

Ilaoa has also been a member of the Columbus Destroyers.

Early years
Ilaoa played high school football at North Stafford High School in Stafford, Virginia as both a wide receiver and running back. In his junior season, he set the Virginia AAA record for receiving yards in a season (1,299 in 12 games). Ilaoa was the 2000 Washington Post Offensive Player of the Year and two-time All-Met.

College career
Ilaoa began his collegiate career on the Hawaii Warriors football team in 2001. Ilaoa started 8 games in the 2002 season as a wide receiver. In 2005, Ilaoa moved to the running back position and rushed for a team-high 643 yards. He was granted a rare sixth year of eligibility because of injuries in 2006 and amassed 1,827 all-purpose yards. Ilaoa's 20 career rushing touchdowns are sixth in Hawaii history.

Professional career

Philadelphia Eagles
Ilaoa was drafted 236th overall in the 2007 NFL Draft by the Philadelphia Eagles. On July 22, 2007, Ilaoa agreed to a four-year contract with the Eagles. He was cut by the Eagles on September 1, 2007.

Columbus Destroyers
In 2008, Ilaoa played with the Columbus Destroyers of the Arena Football League. However, he was eventually sidelined by a shoulder injury. At the end of that season, the Arena Football League ceased operations.

References

External links

1983 births
Living people
American football fullbacks
American football wide receivers
Hawaii Rainbow Warriors football players
Philadelphia Eagles players
Columbus Destroyers players
American sportspeople of Samoan descent
Players of American football from Oakland, California
Players of American football from Virginia
High school football coaches in Hawaii
People from Stafford, Virginia